Hicaz Buselik Jewish Kanto is a Greek, Jewish and Turkish folkloric tune syrtos or hasaposerviko.

Greek Lyrics
Πράσινες ντομάτες και πικρές ελιές
και τα κρυφομιλήματα δεν είν' καλές δουλειές.

Άγουρες ντομάτες, πράσινες ελιές
σαν δεν με θες, πουλάκι μου, γιατί δεν μου το λες;

Κόκκινες ντομάτες, φύλλα πράσινα
εις υγείαν της παρέας κι έξω βάσανα.

See also 
Yalelli
Makam
Andros

References

https://divanmakam.com/attachments/hardayi-lillora-sisoz-kiroz-yahudi-kantosu-belirsiz-hicaz-i-acem-hicaz-i-turki-hicaz-i-ussak-v1-pdf.30438/

Turkish songs
Jewish songs
Greek songs
Songwriter unknown
Year of song unknown